Forward Versatile Disc (FVD) is an offshoot of DVD developed in Taiwan jointly by the Advanced Optical Storage Research Alliance (AOSRA) and the Industrial Technology Research Institute (ITRI) as a less expensive alternative for high-definition content. The disc is similar in structure to a DVD, in that pit length is the same and a red laser is used to read it, but the track width has been shortened slightly to allow the disc to have 5.4 GB of storage per layer as opposed to 4.7 GB for a standard DVD. The specification allows up to three layers for total of 15 GB in storage.  WMV9 is used as the video codec allowing for 135 minutes of 720p video on a dual layer disc, and 135 minutes of 1080i video on a three-layer disc. FVD uses AACS copy protection which is one of the schemes used in both HD DVD and Blu-ray Discs.

An FVD disc can either be an FVD-1 or FVD-2 disc:
FVD-1: The coding format of the first generation of FVD adopts 8/16 modulation codes (same as DVD).
FVD-2: The second generation will use the more efficient 8/15 coding for increasing the ECC capability (to avoid DVD patents).

References

External links
CMC Magnetics (Archived From The Original)
The Register: FVD goes mass-market

120 mm discs
Rotating disc computer storage media
Video storage
Consumer electronics